Félix Ormazabal Askasibar (5 May 1940 – 15 January 2022) was a Spanish politician. A member of the Basque Nationalist Party, he served as Deputy General of Álava from 1995 to 1999. He was also a member of the Basque Parliament in 1980 and again from 1984 to 1995. He died in Vitoria-Gasteiz on 15 January 2022, at the age of 81.

Biography
Félix Ormazabal was born in Araia, Álava in 1940, he studied law and theology. As a result of his involvement, he was detained during a month. He entered politics after meeting José Ángel Cuerda, who served as his lawyer during his detention.

He was first elected to public office in 1979, when he became a member of the Asparrena municipal council. He continued in that office until 1988, under Carlos Garaikoetxea and José Antonio Ardanza. He was also a member of the first government of the  after its restoration, serving with Deputy General Emilio Guevara. He was elected to the Basque Parliament five consecutive times, starting in 1980.

In 1995 he was elected to the General Assembly of Álava and subsequently became Deputy General. He headed a majority coalition government with Eusko Alkartasuna and the Socialist Party until 1997, when the Socialist Party left the coalition as a consequence of José Ángel Cuerda dismissing members of the party from the ruling coalition at the Vitoria-Gasteiz city council. He was the leading candidate of the Basque Nationalist Party in the 1999 election, in which it finished second behind the People's Party. In the second round of the investiture vote the Socialist Party supported , the People's Party candidate, thus putting an end to Ormazabal's tenure as Deputy General.

He retired from politics in 2005. He died in January 2022 after a sudden heart attack at his home in Araia.

References

1940 births
2022 deaths
Politicians from the Basque Country (autonomous community)
People from Álava
Basque Nationalist Party politicians
Deputies General of Álava
Government ministers of the Basque Country (autonomous community)
Members of the 1st Basque Parliament
Members of the 2nd Basque Parliament
Members of the 3rd Basque Parliament
Members of the 4th Basque Parliament
Members of the 5th Basque Parliament
Municipal councillors in the Basque Country (autonomous community)
20th-century Spanish lawyers
20th-century Spanish Roman Catholic priests
Basque Roman Catholic priests
Anti-Francoism
Prisoners and detainees of Spain
Basque Anti-Francoists